Beachwood High School is a four-year college preparatory public high school located in Beachwood, Ohio, a suburb of Cleveland. It is part of the Beachwood City School District.

Recognition
Beachwood has earned three U.S. Department of Education Blue Ribbon Awards, the highest rating of Excellent from the State of Ohio Department of Education, membership in the Ohio Department of Education "Schools to Watch," a National 21st Century School of Distinction Award for Technology Excellence, induction in the Ohio Association of Elementary School Administrators Hall of Fame, two Excellence in School Management Awards from the Harvard Business School Club, and national recognition as among the Top 100 in Music Education from the American Music Conference.

Sports Programs

Football 
In 2022, Beachwood's football team finished the season with a 2-8 record.

Soccer 
In 2022, Beachwood's Men's soccer team went 17-3-1 in the regular season  before winning the Division III Northeast District 3 Final, defeating Kirtland in penalty kicks. They would go on to beat Norwayne in the Regional Semifinals before ultimately losing to Cardinal Mooney in the Regional Finals.

Notable alumni and faculty
Armond Budish - politician
Marc Cohn - singer-songwriter and musician
Jennifer Eberhardt - professor
Alan Fried - amateur wrestler
Brad Goldberg - Major League Baseball player and coach
Jonathan Goldstein - screenwriter, television writer and producer, and film director
Jonah Koslen - singer-songwriter and musician
Josh Mandel - politician
Terren Peizer - investor and business executive
Tina Tchen - lawyer and President Barack Obama Administration official
Alex Wyse - actor, writer, director, and producer

External links
 Beachwood High School

Notes and references

High schools in Cuyahoga County, Ohio
Beachwood, Ohio
Public high schools in Ohio